Liolaemus uptoni is a species of lizard in the family Iguanidae or the family Liolaemidae. The species is endemic to Argentina.

References

uptoni
Lizards of South America
Reptiles of Argentina
Endemic fauna of Argentina
Reptiles described in 2006
Taxa named by José Miguel Alfredo María Cei